Gary Community School Corporation serves most students who reside in Gary, Indiana.

History 
In 2017, Gary Community Corp became the first school system in Indiana involved in a state takeover. Control of the district was transferred from the elected school board and appointed school superintendent to the State of Indiana's Distressed Unit Appeals Board, which placed MGT Consulting and Emergency Fiscal Manager Peggy Hinckley in charge of managing the district. Gary school board President Rosie Washington was quoted as saying "We Have No Power", in the context of the state's takeover. In November 2018, it was discovered that former Indiana Superintendent Tony Bennett, who directed policies that led to the state takeover, has an ownership stake in the for-profit company selected to manage the takeover with the potential to earn $11.4 million.

School uniforms
All GCSC students from pre-Kindergarten through the 12 grade are required to wear school uniforms. Starting the 2007-2008 Academic School year, all schools will follow the new "school uniform" policy. The school uniform policy varies for school and grade level, such as color.

Schools
All schools are located in Gary.

Gary Community School Corporation, which operates most of the public schools in the city proper.

Traditional high schools:
West Side Leadership Academy

Middle schools:
 Williams Annex -  it is the sole school in the Gary CSC that only serves middle school

Elementary schools:
Benjamin Banneker Achievement Center
Bailly Stem Academy

Beveridge Elementary School
Glen Park Academy For Excellence In Learning
Jefferson Elementary School
Jacques Marquette Elementary School
Frankie W. McCullough Academy for Girls
Dr. Bernard C. Watson Academy for Boys
Dr. Bernard C. Watson Academy For Boys, an all boys' zoned elementary school, opened in 2006 in the former Dr. Charles R. Drew Elementary School. McCullough Academy for Girls, an all girls' zoned elementary school, opened in the former David O. Duncan Elementary School in 2006. These schools served Dorie Miller Public Housing Development and Delaney Public Housing Development. Watson was scheduled to close in 2014.
Daniel Hale Williams Elementary School

Early childhood centers:
Mary McLeod Bethune Early Childhood Development Center

Ungraded:
Gary Area Career Center

Former schools

High schools

Middle schools

Elementary schools

See also 
Gary Charter Schools
Lake Ridge Schools Corporation
Education in Gary, Indiana

Notes

References

External links
 

Education in Lake County, Indiana
School districts in Indiana
Education in Gary, Indiana
School districts established in 1909
1909 establishments in Indiana